The Williamson River of south-central Oregon in the United States is about  long. Together with its principal tributary, the Sprague River, it provides over half the inflow to Upper Klamath Lake, the largest freshwater lake in Oregon. The lake's outlet is the Link River, which flows into Lake Ewauna and the Klamath River.

Course 
It flows in a large arc north through the mountains, then west, then southwest through Klamath Marsh and the Klamath Marsh National Wildlife Refuge. At Chiloquin, it receives the Sprague River from the left at about river mile (RM) 11 (river kilometer (RK) 18).

Watershed 
At lower elevations along big streams, the Williamson watershed supports irrigated pastures and other farmlands. Livestock grazing occurs in many locations in the basin. Forests, often cut for timber, cover about 81 percent of the basin and farms account for 6 percent, while range, wetlands, water, and urban areas cover a combined 13 percent. Precipitation in the basin, which lies in the rain shadow of the Cascade Range, averages  a year along the Williamson above its confluence with the Sprague and about  along the Sprague.

Recreation 
The Williamson is known for especially large wild Great Basin redband trout, which move into the river to spawn and to escape Upper Klamath Lake when it gets warm. Three-year-old fish "commonly reach  or better." Smaller numbers of brown trout also thrive in the Williamson, especially below Spring Creek. Lost River suckers also populate the river but are protected and cannot be caught and kept legally. Smaller rainbow trout and brook trout live in the river above Klamath Marsh. Much of the land along the river is privately owned, and public access is limited.

History 
Formerly diked and drained for farming, the delta provides habitat for millions of migrating birds as well as many native species of fish, mollusks, and aquatic plants.

In early Pleistocene times, the Klamath Marsh and Upper Klamath lake were much larger; and were maintained as shallow lakes and marshes by the continued subsidence of the basin in the face of abundant sedimentation and uplift along the eastern fault scarp. The eruption of Mount Mazama about 7,700 years ago contributed an enormous amount of sediment to the lake and marsh basins, and filled the canyon of the Williamson River.

See also
List of longest streams of Oregon

References

Rivers of Oregon
Tributaries of the Klamath River
Rivers of Klamath County, Oregon